Buraimoh is a Nigerian surname. Notable people with the surname include:

Lanre Buraimoh (born 1976), Nigerian-born artist 
Jimoh Buraimoh (born 1943), Nigerian painter and artist, father of Lanre

See also
Braimoh

Surnames of Nigerian origin